Saba Battery Tehran Basketball Club also known as Saba Mehr Qazvin Basketball Club was an Iranian professional basketball club based in Tehran and Qazvin, Iran. They competed in the Iranian Basketball Super League.

The team was part of Saba Battery Club, owned by Saba Battery Co from 2002 to 2008. In 2008, Saba Battery Co. refused to hold the team anymore and club saved by a private company and changed its name to Saba Mehr. on April 2009 the club transferred from Tehran to Qazvin.

Tournament records

Iranian Super League
 2003–04: Champions
 2004–05: 2nd place
 2005–06: Champions
 2006–07: Champions
 2007–08: 2nd place
 2008–09: 3rd place
 2009–10: 4th place

WABA Champions Cup
 2005: 2nd place
 2006: 2nd place
 2007: Champions
 2008: 2nd place
 2009: 3rd place

Asia Champions Cup
 2005: 4th place
 2006: 5th place
 2007: Champions
 2008: Champions

Coaches
  Mehran Shahintab (2002–2010)

Notable former players

Squads
FIBA Asia Champions Cup 2007
Behnam Afradi, Babak Nezafat, Saman Veisi, Mohammad Sistani, Hamed Afagh, Aidin Nikkhah Bahrami, Gabe Muoneke, Garth Joseph, Asghar Kardoust, Karam Ahmadian, Samad Nikkhah Bahrami, Behzad Afradi. Coach: Mehran Shahintab
FIBA Asia Champions Cup 2008
Mohammad Masoud Irani, Kamran Jamshidvand, Hamed Afagh, Mehdi Kamrani, Mohammad Sistani, DaJuan Tate, Gabe Muoneke, Asghar Kardoust, Karam Ahmadian, Saeid Tabeshnia, Hamed Haddadi, Samad Nikkhah Bahrami. Coach: Mehran Shahintab

References

External links
page on Asia-Basket

Basketball teams in Iran
Basketball teams established in 2002
Sport in Qazvin Province
2002 establishments in Iran